Andhra Pradesh, a state of India, has airports which have access to international flights, domestic and some non used airstrips for emergency purposes. All the airports in Andhra Pradesh are operated by either Airports Authority of India or Andhra Pradesh Airports Development Corporation Ltd. (APADCL).

Andhra Pradesh Airports provides services to tourists and the state population commuting to different parts of the state. Vishakhapatnam Airport and Vijayawada Airport are the International Airports and gets the major attention for commercial reasons. Tirupati Airport is an international airport which serve major pilgrim population . Other airports in the state with domestic flights are located at Kadapa, Rajahmundry which are in operation.

List 
The list includes the domestic, military and nonoperational airports with their respective ICAO and IATA codes.

References

Andhra Pradesh
 
Buildings and structures in Andhra Pradesh
Airports